William Frenaye (May 22, 1900 – April 10, 1961) was an American architect. His work was part of the architecture event in the art competition at the 1932 Summer Olympics.

References

1900 births
1961 deaths
20th-century American architects
Olympic competitors in art competitions
People from Colorado Springs, Colorado